"The Winker's Song (Misprint)", also known as "The Wanker's Song" and "I'm a Wanker", is a 1978 British comedy single. It was written and performed by Doc Cox, under the pseudonym of "Ivor Biggun and the Red Nosed Burglars" and produced by Beggars Banquet Records. The song was released on 2 September 1978. It reached number 22 on the UK Singles Chart despite not being aired on the radio owing to obscenities pertaining to masturbation within the song.

History
Founded in 1974, Beggars Banquet Records was known for the left of centre acts signed to it, with Doc Cox being signed to them in 1978. "The Winker's Song" was released in 1978; the original title was "The Wanker's Song", but it was edited to "The Winker's Song" because of fears that shops would not stock it. The song did not receive airplay on national radio stations owing to the content referring to masturbation and was banned from being broadcast by the BBC for being sexually explicit. However, "The Winker's Song" received attention after Johnny Rotten as a guest editor of New Musical Express endorsed it as a "definite buy".

The song started in the UK Singles Chart at number 68 and remained in the charts for 12 weeks. It reached its highest position of 22 on 1 October 1978, bringing Beggars Banquet Records their first UK Top 40 hit. It was later released on Cox's first album, which was named after the song, The Winker's Album (Misprint).

The song has continued to be played into modern times; it has been used to clear the dance floor in Ibiza and Brighton.

Analysis
"The Winker's Song" has been compared to the style of George Formby, owing to its use of ukuleles.

References

1978 singles
Comedy songs
Obscenity controversies in music
Masturbation in fiction
1978 songs
Beggars Banquet Records singles